Don Jeffrey "Jeff" Meldrum (born May 24, 1958) is a Full Professor of Anatomy and Anthropology in the Department of Biological Sciences at Idaho State University. Meldrum is also Adjunct Professor in the Department of Physical and Occupational Therapy and the Department of Anthropology. Meldrum is an expert on foot morphology and locomotion in primates.

Biography

Meldrum received his B.S. in zoology specializing in vertebrate locomotion at Brigham Young University in 1982, his M.S. at BYU in 1984, and a Ph.D. in anatomical sciences, with an emphasis in biological anthropology, from Stony Brook University in 1989. He held the position of postdoctoral visiting assistant professor at Duke University Medical Center from 1989 to 1991. Meldrum worked at Northwestern University's Department of Cell, Molecular and Structural Biology for a short while in 1993 before joining the faculty of Idaho State University where he currently teaches.

Meldrum has published numerous academic papers ranging from vertebrate evolutionary morphology, the emergence of bipedal locomotion in modern humans, and the plausability behind the Sasquatch phenomena, in addition to being a co-editor of a series of books on paleontology.  Meldrum also co-edited From Biped to Strider: The Emergence of Modern Human Walking with Charles E. Hilton.

Meldrum, who is an "active member" of the Church of Jesus Christ of Latter-day Saints, has also studied and commented upon issues of genetics and the Book of Mormon in his book "Who Are the Children of Lehi? ", written with Trent D. Stephens.

Cryptozoology

Meldrum has attracted media attention due to his interest in Bigfoot. Meldrum believes that Bigfoot exists and his research on the topic has been criticized by some as pseudoscientific. Meldrum authored Sasquatch: Legend Meets Science in 2006. The book was heavily criticized in a detailed review in the Skeptical Inquirer. Anthropologist David J. Daegling commented that author was "unable or unwilling to distinguish good research from bad, science from pseudoscience" and the book failed to provide a thorough scientific analysis. Matt Cartmill reviewed the book in the American Journal of Physical Anthropology.

Meldrum was present at a 2011 conference in Siberia regarding the Siberian Snowman, which included among other things investigating alleged footprints that had been spotted in a Kemerovo cave. He acknowledged that the results of the Russian field trip to the cave site were most likely fraudulent. He suggested that the supposed evidence found was simply an attempt by local government officials to drum up publicity.

References

External links
 Meldrum's Idaho State University profile
 Meldrum's ResearchGate profile

1958 births
Living people
American anthropologists
American Latter Day Saints
Bigfoot
Brigham Young University alumni
Cryptozoologists
Duke University faculty
Idaho State University faculty
Stony Brook University alumni
Northwestern University people